Saïkati is a 1992 Kenyan film directed by the filmmaker Anne Mungai. It was the first feature film by a Nairobi-based female filmmaker.

Plot
A young Masai women has a future determined for her by relatives to marry the son of the chief. However, she plans to improve herself through education. She runs from the village to seek a better life in the capital, Nairobi, where she faces several challenges.

Cast
 Esther Muthee 
 Regina Macharia
 Eric Babu 
 Anthony Njuguna

References

External links
 

1992 films
Kenyan drama films